Whitney is an unorganized territory in Penobscot County, Maine, United States. It is designated as Township 5 Range 1 of the North of Bingham's Penobscot Purchase.  The population was 6 at the 2020 census. T5 R1 NBPP is also known as Pukakon Township.

Geography 
Much of the area of the township is occupied by several lakes at the headwaters of the West Branch of the St. Croix River, including Scraggly Lake and Junior Lake.

Demographics 

As of the 2010 Census, there were five people living in the location.

References

Unorganized territories in Maine
Populated places in Penobscot County, Maine